John Elliott (born September 5, 1963) is an American professional golfer who played on the PGA Tour and the Nationwide Tour.

Elliott joined the Nationwide Tour in 1991 and didn't find much success but went through qualifying school and earned his PGA Tour card for 1992. He struggled during his rookie year and had to go through qualifying school again to retain his card. He returned to the Nationwide Tour in 1994 where he won the Nike Mississippi Gulf Coast Classic. He returned to the PGA Tour in 1996, earning his Tour card through qualifying school for the third time. After another unsuccessful year on tour, he returned to the Nationwide Tour in 1997 where he won the Nike Alabama Classic. In 1998, he recorded two runner-up finishes on the Nationwide Tour and earned his PGA Tour card through qualifying school for the fourth time. In his return to the PGA Tour, he struggled and returned to the Nationwide Tour in 2000. Between 2000 and 2004 he recorded five runner-up finishes on tour. He returned to the PGA Tour in 2005, earning his card through qualifying school for the fifth time and it would be his last year on Tour.

As of 2016, Elliott caddies summers at Shelter Harbor in Charlestown, Rhode Island, and winters at Dye Preserve in Jupiter, Florida.

Professional wins (5)

Nike Tour wins (2)

*Note: The 1997 Nike Alabama Classic was shortened to 54 holes due to weather.

Nike Tour playoff record (1–0)

Other wins (3)
1992 Massachusetts Open
1996 Vermont Open
2010 Rhode Island Open

Results in major championships

CUT = missed the half-way cut
"T" = tied
Note: Elliott never played in the Masters Tournament or The Open Championship.

See also
1991 PGA Tour Qualifying School graduates
1992 PGA Tour Qualifying School graduates
1995 PGA Tour Qualifying School graduates
1998 PGA Tour Qualifying School graduates
2004 PGA Tour Qualifying School graduates

References

External links

American male golfers
PGA Tour golfers
Golfers from Connecticut
Central Connecticut State University alumni
People from Bristol, Connecticut
1963 births
Living people